Acidromodes is a genus of moths in the family Geometridae.

Species
Acidromodes contains the following species:
Acidromodes muelleri Hausmann, 1999
Acidromodes nilotica (Wiltshire, 1985) - type species (as Acidaliastis nilotica); and the following subspecies:
Acidromodes nilotica legraini Hausmann, 1999
Acidromodes porphyretica (L. B. Prout, 1925)
Acidromodes saharae (Wiltshire, 1985)

References

Microloxiini
Geometridae genera